Under-19 World Floorball Championships are being held for males since 2001 and for females since 2004. The championships for males are held in odd years, while those for females are held in even years.

The first Under-19 World Floorball Championships were held in 2001 in Germany. The Swedishmen were the first World Champions. Two years later, a B-Division Tournament was played. The first female World Championships took place in 2004 in Finland, and the Swedish team won again. In 2008, the first female B-Division tournament was played.

Male Under-19 World Championships

Medal table

Female Under-19 World Championships

Medal table

References

Floorball World Championships
World youth sports competitions
Under-19 sport
Recurring sporting events established in 2001